Buckshoal Farm is a property along with a historic home located near Omega, Halifax County, Virginia. The earliest section was built in the early-19th century, and is the two-story pitched-roof log section of the main residence. The larger two-story, pitched-roof section of the house with its ridge perpendicular to the older section was added in 1841.  It features a porch that is configured to follows the shape of the ell and bay of the front of the house.  The third two-story addition dates to circa 1910. Also on the property are the contributing log smoke house, well-house and a frame shed.  Buckshoal Farm was the birthplace and favorite retreat of Governor William M. Tuck.

It was listed on the National Register of Historic Places in 1987.

References

Houses on the National Register of Historic Places in Virginia
Houses completed in 1841
Houses in Halifax County, Virginia
National Register of Historic Places in Halifax County, Virginia